Piero Ginori Conti, Prince of Trevignano, (Florence, 3 June 1865 - Florence, 3 December 1939) was a businessman and Italian politician.

Son of Gino Ginori Conti and Pauline Fabbri, an old aristocratic family of Florence, Piero Ginori Conti married in 1894 Adriana de Larderel (1872–1925), daughter of Count Florestan - nephew of François - and his cousin Marcella de Larderel and heir to one of the most significant assets in Tuscany.

Geothermal electricity and Boric Acid
In 1904, Piero Ginori Conti became the head of the boric acid extraction firm founded by his wife's great-grandfather in Larderello, and took the establishment in a new direction, with the use of natural steam to produce electricity. His business plan was: improving the quality of products, with increased production and lower prices, and exploitation of natural dry steam geysers to produce electricity. On 4 July 1904, at Larderello, Piero Ginori Conti powered five bulbs from a dynamo driven by a reciprocating steam engine using geothermal power. In 1905 he increased power production to 20kW.

This system improved to the point that in 1916 it distributed 2750 kW of electricity in the entire area surrounding the village, including nearby cities of Volterra and Pomarance. With a new international reputation, Larderello was visited by Marie Curie during the First World War.

In 1912, he succeeded his father-in-law, who had no male heirs, as the majority shareholder of the family business. This year sees the installation of the first geothermal power plant in Larderello, and the merger of three companies competing in the production of boric acid into a new company, the Società Boracifera di Larderello. This restructuring strengthens the family's control of the company's stock and compensates for the increasingly stiff competition from America and the decline of boric acid production.

Fascism's influence on business
The geothermal electricity project was put on hold until 1921, after the war and years of social unrest were calmed by the arrival to power of Benito Mussolini, of whom the Ginori Conti / Larderel families were big supporter.

The first general campaign in favor of the strike at Castelnuovo near Larderello broke out in 1915, in spite of the care that "prince-father," faithful to the principles of Larderel, offered to the wives and children of the workers who were on the battlefront. After the war, in which his children and wife (a nurse) served, the first strike hit the various establishments in the Larderello S.p.A., except Larderello itself: the resistance of the worker's union ran from 9 May to 9 June and continued sporadically until October 1920.

The work resumed with enormous social losses for the workers: 400 employees were laid off, health care stopped being free, and a paid salary ceased to be guaranteed in case of illness. Moreover, workers now had to pay rent for their homes, were enrolled in the National Fascist Party (PNF) and came under surveillance and guard by members of the same PNF. The area fell under fascist influence from Larderello, until the creation of the tenth combat battalion on 16 October 1920, the first and only in the area until 1922. In October that year, the workers participated in the march on Rome.

Tuscan fascists built local networks through the various sports clubs or other diversions already set up under the influence of philanthropic Larderel and Ginori Conti.

Later Years

On 27 March 1931 the first fumarole exploded with a force and a roar so constant that local residents sealed doors and windows to be able to sleep. The noise was such as to be heard in the cities of Volterra and Massa Marittima, 25 km away. In 1936, Ferrovie dello Stato opened a new 60 MW power, producing two million pounds of water vapor, in addition to natural gas (93% carbon dioxide, 2.5% hydrogen sulphide, 4.5% of residual fuel).

The prince, many times deputy of Volterra (1896–1919) and senator of the Kingdom in 1919, was now assisted by his eldest son John (1899–1972) [1], doctor of chemistry, general manager of establishments, and his youngest son Frederick (1909–1975), Deputy Director General and Director of Research Laboratory, which opened in 1938.

The independence achieved by the Società Boracifera di Larderello and emancipation from the two groups hitherto hegemonic power system Società Ligure Toscana di Elettricità and the Società Electrica Valdarno, then merged into Selt-Valdarno, explains the growing interest of the Ferrovie dello Stato for the boric acid plants. After the signing of several agreements after 1932, the Società Boracifera di Larderello finally passed into the hands of the Ferrovie dello Stato in 1939. Despite the war, the Ferrovie dello Stato generated further research into steam and electricity generation, will peak production at 900GWh in 1943.

Death
Piero Ginori Conti, held in high esteem by the Duke, was made a Grand Cross and Grand Cordon of the Order of Saints Maurice and Lazarus, and in 1939, Minister of State. That distinction earned him a state funeral celebrated in the Basilica of Santa Maria del Fiore in Florence, on 5 December 1939. He left his children a legacy worth 15 million liras at the time, in real estate and securities.

Family

The prince was widowed in 1925. He remarried to a French woman named Odette Guillemard. From the first marriage he had four sons and two daughters; from the second, a single daughter.

The prince was also a Rotarian in the early years of Rotary International in Italy. He became governor of the then District 46, in the year 1928-1929 as well as Chairman of the RC of Florence.

References

External links
 
 
 

1865 births
1939 deaths
Italian politicians
Italian princes
Italian businesspeople